Mukesh Sharma is an Indian politician and a member of the 16th Legislative Assembly in Uttar Pradesh state of India. He represents the Shikarpur constituency of Uttar Pradesh and was a member of the Samajwadi Party political party until 2017.

Early life and education
Sharma was born in Gautam Budh Nagar district. He is educated till twelfth grade (alma mater not known).

Political career
Sharma has been a MLA for one term. He represented the Shikarpur constituency and was a member of the Samajwadi Party political party. Sharma was expelled from the SP along with his brother Bhagwan Sharma for defying the party whip by cross-voting in favor of a Bharatiya Janata Party nominee and attempted to contest with the BJP, but were denied tickets, after which, they joined the Rashtriya Lok Dal.

Posts held

See also
 Shikarpur (Assembly constituency)
 Sixteenth Legislative Assembly of Uttar Pradesh
 Uttar Pradesh Legislative Assembly

References

Samajwadi Party politicians
Uttar Pradesh MLAs 2012–2017
People from Gautam Buddh Nagar district
1981 births
Living people